Sara Errani was the two-time defending champion, but chose not to participate.
Dominika Cibulková won the title, defeating Christina McHale in the final, 7–6(7–3), 4–6, 6–4

Seeds

Draw

Finals

Top half

Bottom half

Qualifying

Seeds

Qualifiers

Lucky losers

Qualifying draw

First qualifier

Second qualifier

Third qualifier

Fourth qualifier

External links
 WTA tournament draws

2014 Abierto Mexicano Telcel